Ambikapur Part-X is a census town in Cachar district  in the state of Assam, India.

Demographics
 India census, Ambikapur Part-X had a population of 10,014. Males constitute 53% of the population and females 47%. Ambikapur Part-X has an average literacy rate of 71%, higher than the national average of 59.5%; with 56% of the males and 44% of females literate. 12% of the population is under 6 years of age.

References

Cities and towns in Cachar district
Silchar